Talent Bizeki (born 9 December 2000) is a Zimbabwean footballer who plays as a midfielder. She has been a member of the Zimbabwe women's national team.

Club career
Bizeki has played for Maningi Queens FC in Zimbabwe.

International career
Bizeki capped for Zimbabwe at senior level during the 2020 COSAFA Women's Championship.

References

2000 births
Living people
Zimbabwean women's footballers
Women's association football midfielders
Zimbabwe women's international footballers